Roger Clarke (June 11, 1940  – August 28, 2014) was a Jamaican politician. He was the Minister of Agriculture from 2012 until his death.

Clarke, who had recovered from a successful back surgery at Jackson Memorial Hospital, died on August 28, 2014, from a suspected heart attack at Fort Lauderdale International Airport in Florida, where he was awaiting a flight to Jamaica. He was pronounced dead at hospital.

References

1940 births
2014 deaths
Ministers of Agriculture of Jamaica
Members of the House of Representatives of Jamaica